Akébou is a prefecture located in the Plateaux Region of Togo.

Canton (administrative divisions) of Akébou include Kougnohou (Akébou), Djon, Gbendé, Sérégbéné, Yalla, Kamina-Akébou, Vèh, and Kpalavé.

References 

Prefectures of Togo